Hieracium pseudopellucidum is a species of flowering plant belonging to the family Asteraceae.

Its native range is Finland to northwestern and northern European Russia.

References

pseudopellucidum
Flora of Finland
Flora of North European Russia
Flora of Northwest European Russia
Plants described in 1893